Micraglossa is a genus of moths of the family Crambidae.

Species
Micraglossa aureata Inoue, 1982
Micraglossa beia Li, Li & Nuss, 2010
Micraglossa citrochroa (Turner, 1908)
Micraglossa convatalalis Klunder van Gijen, 1913
Micraglossa cupritincta Hampson, 1917
Micraglossa flavidalis Hampson, 1907
Micraglossa manoi Sasaki, 1998
Micraglossa michaelshafferi Li, Li & Nuss, 2010
Micraglossa nana Li, Li & Nuss, 2010
Micraglossa oenealis Hampson, 1897
Micraglossa scoparialis Warren, 1891
Micraglossa straminealis (Hampson, 1903)
Micraglossa tagalica Nuss, 1998
Micraglossa tricitra (Meyrick, 1930)
Micraglossa zhongguoensis Li, Li & Nuss, 2010

References

 , 2010: Taxonomic revision and biogeography of Micraglossa Warren, 1891 from laurel forests in China (Insecta: Lepidoptera: Pyraloidea: Crambidae: Scopariinae). Arthropod Systematics & Phylogeny 68 (2): 159-180. Full article: .
 , 1998: The Scopariinae and Heliothelinae stat. rev. (Lepidoptera: Pyraloidea: Crambidae) of the Oriental Region- a revisional synopsis with descriptions of new species from the Philippines and Sumatra. Nachrichten entomologische Verein Apollo 17 Suppl.: 475-528.
 , 1998: Notes on the Scopariinae from Taiwan, with descriptions of nine new species (Lepidoptera: Crambidae). Tinea 15 (3): 191-201.

External links
Natural History Museum Lepidoptera genus database

Scopariinae
Crambidae genera
Taxa named by William Warren (entomologist)